Spencer Lewis Hayman (6 January 1885 – 14 September 1946) was an Australian rules footballer who played with Melbourne in the Victorian Football League (VFL).

Family
The son of Henry Hunt Hayman (1855–1925), and Rachel Hayman (−1913), née Solomon, Spencer Lewis Hayman was born in Petersham, New South Wales on 6 January 1885.

He married Agnes Lindsay Paltridge (1887–1962) on 22 January 1913.

One of their children, Captain Peter Spencer Hayman (1916–1942), served in the Second AIF with the 2nd/24th Infantry, was awarded the Military Cross in 1941, and was killed in action, in Libya, on 11 July 1942.

Education
He attended Scotch College, Melbourne for four years (1897 to 1900), and played in the school's 1900 premiership-winning First XVIII.

Football

North Adelaide (SAFA)
He was cleared from Melbourne to the North Adelaide Football Club in the South Australian Football Association (SAFA) in April 1910.

Death
He died in Bendigo, Victoria, on 14 September 1946.

Notes

References
 Scotch's first 66 VFL/AFL Players, Great Scot, (September 2010), Scotch College, Melbourne.
 Holmesby, Russell & Main, Jim (2014). The Encyclopedia of AFL Footballers: every AFL/VFL player since 1897 (10th ed.), (Seaford), BAS Publishing. .

External links 
 
 
 Spencer Hayman profile at Demonwiki.

1885 births
1946 deaths
People educated at Scotch College, Melbourne
Australian rules footballers from Victoria (Australia)
Melbourne Football Club players